Nasser Al Tayyar (Arabic: د. ناصر بن عقيل عبد الله الطيار b. 1957) Is a Saudi businessman. He is the Founder and Deputy Chairman of Al Tayyar Travel Group. He has interests in many industries, including Leisure, Tourism, Education, Transport, Real Estate, Retail Trading, Hospitality, Aviation and Food and Beverages.

Al Tayyar is the President of Arab Publisher House and publisher of the leading business magazine, Forbes Middle East. He is a Member of the Board of Madina Press, one of the oldest publishers in the Middle East. Al Tayyar was ranked as one of the most influential Saudi figures from the private sector in the Tourism industry by Arabian Travel News, which compiled a list of the 50 most powerful figures within the Travel sector.

Early life and education
Al Tayyar is the son of Aqeel Al Tayyar, hailing from the Saudi Arabian province of Zulfi.

Career

In 1980, he launched the first Al Tayyar Group office in the business centre of Riyadh.

In 2008, he helped start Nile Air.

Arrest

On 4 November 2017, Nasser Al Tayyar was arrested in Saudi Arabia in a "corruption crackdown" conducted by a new royal anti-corruption committee. This was done by the authority of Crown Prince Mohammad Bin Salman.

According to  Bloomberg News, Al Tayyar carries a personal fortune of $600 million and is among the wealthiest of those arrested, which included Alwaleed bin Talal, ($19 billion), Mohammed Al Amoudi, ($10.1 billion), and Saleh Kamel, ($3.7 billion).

Affiliations
Al Tayyar is an elite member of The World Tourism Organization, the Saudi Chambers Definition, International Congress and Convention Association, the GCC Commercial Arbitration Center, Ministry of Justice Saudi Arabia, and Consulting Member Saudi Commission for Tourism and Antiquities. He serves as chairman of the board at Nile Air, Egypt’s second national carrier.

Personal life
Al Tayyar is married and has 7 children.

See also
Nile Air
Elegant Resorts
Clarity Travel Management

References

External links 
     Al Tayyar Group website, History page
    Al Tayyar Group website, About US page
    Al Tayyar Group website, Press Release
  Arabian Travel News Magazine has compiled a list of the 50 most powerful figures within the Travel sector
   Al Tayyar Travel Group acquires UK tour operator Elegant Resorts
   Al Tayyar Travel Group ranked first in the list of the most powerful Travel and Tourism companies in the Middle East
    Special Report on the Arabian Travel Power 50, 2010
    Pdf Saudi based Al Tayyar Travel Group undergoes IPO to generate one of the highest private equity return multiples in MENA for Amwal Al Khaleej

1957 births
Living people